Augustine Ahinful (born 30 November 1974) is a Ghanaian former professional footballer who played as a second striker, notably for Ankaragücü in the Süper Lig.

Club career 
Ahinful was born in Accra. He was the Ghana Premier League topscorer on 1992–93 season with Goldfield Obuasi. He played for Borussia Dortmund in Germany, Grasshoppers in Switzerland, União de Leiria and Boavista in Portugal, Venezia in Italy, Ankaragücü and Trabzonspor in Turkey.

International career 
Ahinful made several appearance for the Ghana national team. He participated in the 1993 FIFA World Youth Championship, 1996 Summer Olympics and in the 2000 African Cup of Nations.

Honours

Club
Trabzonspor
Turkish Cup: 2003–04

References

External links
 
 

1974 births
Living people
Footballers from Accra
Ghanaian footballers
Association football forwards
Ghana international footballers
Ghana under-20 international footballers
Ghana Premier League top scorers
Ghana Premier League players
Swiss Super League players
Primeira Liga players
Serie A players
Süper Lig players
Ashanti Gold SC players
Borussia Dortmund players
Borussia Dortmund II players
Grasshopper Club Zürich players
SC Kriens players
U.D. Leiria players
Venezia F.C. players
Boavista F.C. players
MKE Ankaragücü footballers
Trabzonspor footballers
Olympic footballers of Ghana
Footballers at the 1996 Summer Olympics
2000 African Cup of Nations players
Ghana Secondary Technical School alumni
Ghanaian expatriate footballers
Ghanaian expatriate sportspeople in Germany
Expatriate footballers in Germany
Ghanaian expatriate sportspeople in Switzerland
Expatriate footballers in Switzerland
Ghanaian expatriate sportspeople in Portugal
Expatriate footballers in Portugal
Ghanaian expatriate sportspeople in Italy
Expatriate footballers in Italy
Ghanaian expatriate sportspeople in Turkey
Expatriate footballers in Turkey